Garfield is an action hack and slash video game based on the comic strip of the same name developed by The Code Monkeys and published by Hip Games. The game was released on the PlayStation 2 and Windows. It was the first 3D Garfield video game.

Gameplay
The player (playing as Garfield) must clean the house and put everything in the right place before Jon gets home or he will put Garfield on a diet as punishment. Garfield uses the vacuum cleaner to suck out of place objects into the vacuum or fix paintings or pictures, and put out of place objects back in the right place by blowing them out. The game has a time limit of 8 hours and if the player has not cleaned the house in time, a cutscene plays showing Jon finding his house in ruins and the game going back to the main menu.

There are 15 rooms in the game, with some rooms being shared with other rooms. The player must clean these rooms to collect keys to open locked rooms, with color coded keys corresponding to their respective door. Various objects in the rooms, such as wall ornaments and basketballs, can be interacted with using the vacuum cleaner.

The player can only hold three items, and must go to storage boxes to store items they do not need at the moment. Player can also save the game at these storage boxes. There are also various mini games that the player can play, including a block matching game similar to Tetris, a jigsaw puzzle that uses pieces found in the house, and a race with Nermal.

There are different keys to obtain after cleaning each room: cleaning the Den grants access to Jon's Bedroom, while cleaning the Utility Room grants access to the Small Bedroom.

Reception
The Garfield game received very poor ratings. Superpanda of Jeuxvideo.com gave it a 4/20, and Aymeric of jeuxvideopc.com (a PC section of Jeuxvideo.com) heavily criticized the game with a 4/20. PS2 UK Magazine gave it a 2/10. 7Wolf Magazine rated the game 4.8 out of 10. Major points of criticism include poor graphics, slightly sluggish controls, and Odie only flipping around the map when kicked. Due to extremely negative reception, this game is considered by many to be one of the worst Garfield games of all time, also becoming one of the most notable games for bad reception.

Cast
English
 Jon Barnard: Garfield & Jon
 Pam Koldyke: Arlene
 Sarah Kristine: Nermal

Italian
 Riccardo Rodi: Garfield
 Claudio Rini: Jon
 Renata Perti: Arlene and Nermal

French
 Serge Thirlet: Garfield
 Patrick Borg: Jon
 Virginie Ledieu: Arlene and Nermal

Spanish
 Luis Santa Maria: Garfield
 Juan Carlos Garcia: Jon
 Marina Rubio: Arlene 
 Francisca Fernandez: Nermal

German
 Mark Hetterle: Garfield
 Stefan Müller-Ruppert: Jon
 Shandra Schadt: Arlene 
 Nicole Boguth: Nermal

Polish
 Jacek Kawalec: Garfield

References 

2004 video games
Action-adventure games
PlayStation 2 games
Windows games
Video games based on Garfield
Video games developed in the United Kingdom
RenderWare games